Primož Prošt (born 14 July 1983) is a Slovenian professional handball player currently playing for IFK Ystad HK. Since 2009, he has represented Slovenia at several international tournaments, both the World Men's Handball Championships and European Men's Handball Championships.

References

1983 births
Living people
People from Trbovlje
Slovenian male handball players
Expatriate handball players
Slovenian expatriate sportspeople in Germany
21st-century Slovenian people